Evinayong is a town lying atop a small mountain in southeastern Río Muni, central Equatorial Guinea.
 
It is the capital of the Centro Sur Province and the St. Joseph's cathedral is the episcopal see of the Roman Catholic Diocese of Evinayong.
 
In 2001 it had a population of 7,997. It is known for its nightlife, its market and the nearby waterfalls. It also contains a prison.

Notable residents 
 Benjamín Enzema - Olympic sprinter who holds two national athletics records.
 Leandro Mbomio Nsue - Sculptor and artist and former head of the country's Education ministry.

Populated places in Centro Sur